Ji Joo-yeon (born February 8, 1983) is a South Korean actress. She is best known for her role in You Are the Only One. She also appeared Code: Secret Room in 2016.

Filmography

Television series

Television show

References

External links

 

1983 births
Living people
South Korean television actresses
South Korean film actresses
South Korean television personalities
Seoul National University alumni
Mensans